The following highways are numbered 78:

International
 Asian Highway 78
 European route E78

Australia
 Waterfall Way- New South Wales State Route B78

China 
  G78 Expressway

Iran
Road 78

Korea, South
Gukjido 78

New Zealand
 New Zealand State Highway 78 - New Zealand's shortest State Highway

Philippines
 N78 highway (Philippines)

United States
 Interstate 78
 U.S. Route 78
 Alabama State Route 78
 Arizona State Route 78
 Arkansas Highway 78
 California State Route 78
 Colorado State Highway 78
 Connecticut Route 78
 Florida State Road 78
 County Road 78 (Glades County, Florida)
 County Road 78A (Glades County, Florida)
 County Road 78B (Glades County, Florida)
 County Road 78 (Hendry County, Florida)
 County Road 78A (Hendry County, Florida)
 County Road 78 (Lee County, Florida)
 County Road 78A (Lee County, Florida)
 Georgia State Route 78
 Hawaii Route 78
 Idaho State Highway 78
 Illinois Route 78
 Iowa Highway 78
 K-78 (Kansas highway)
 Kentucky Route 78
 Louisiana Highway 78
 Maryland Route 78 (former)
 Massachusetts Route 78 
 M-78 (Michigan highway)
 Minnesota State Highway 78
 County Road 78 (Ramsey County, Minnesota)
 County Road 78 (Scott County, Minnesota)
 Missouri Route 78
Missouri Route 78 (1922) (former)
 Montana Highway 78
 Nebraska Highway 78
 Nebraska Spur 78B
 Nebraska Spur 78C
 Nebraska Spur 78D
 Nebraska Spur 78E
 Nebraska Spur 78F
 Nebraska Spur 78H
 Nebraska Spur 78J
 Nebraska Recreation Road 78K
 Nevada State Route 78 (former)
 New Hampshire Route 78
 County Route 78 (Bergen County, New Jersey)
 New Mexico State Road 78
 New York State Route 78
 County Route 78 (Chemung County, New York)
 County Route 78 (Dutchess County, New York)
 County Route 78 (Herkimer County, New York)
 County Route 78 (Jefferson County, New York)
 County Route 78 (Lewis County, New York)
 County Route 78 (Madison County, New York)
 County Route 78 (Monroe County, New York)
 County Route 78 (Montgomery County, New York)
 County Route 78 (Niagara County, New York)
 County Route 78 (Orange County, New York)
 County Route 78 (Steuben County, New York)
 County Route 78 (Suffolk County, New York)
 County Route 78 (Warren County, New York)
 North Carolina Highway 78
 Ohio State Route 78
 Oklahoma State Highway 78
 Oregon Route 78
 Pennsylvania Route 78 (former)
 Rhode Island Route 78
 Tennessee State Route 78
 Texas State Highway 78
 Texas State Highway Spur 78
 Farm to Market Road 78
 Urban Road 78 (signed as Farm to Market Road 78)
 Utah State Route 78
 Vermont Route 78
 Virginia State Route 78
 West Virginia Route 78
 Wisconsin Highway 78
 Wyoming Highway 78

Territories
 U.S. Virgin Islands Highway 78

See also
A78 road